"Joanna" is a song by Kool & the Gang from their 1983 album In the Heart. It was released as a single in November 1983.

Background
A romantic ballad similar to many of Kool & The Gang's later releases, the song features as its main subject the eponymous lady named Joanna. In the group's music video, Joanna is portrayed as the current owner of a small, roadside café named Joanna's Diner. The video was filmed at the Colonial Diner in Lyndhurst, New Jersey, and the Colonial sign can be seen briefly outside in the opening seconds of the video. Throughout the video, she serves the band members as both cook and waitress as they serenade her, and the video occasionally flashes to her younger days as a dancer at the Cotton Club in Harlem who is in love with the character portrayed by James "J.T." Taylor, the group's lead singer.

Chart performance
The song was an immediate hit, peaking at #2 in the United States for one week. Additionally, the track reached #2 in the UK as well as #1 on the U.S. R&B chart.

Weekly charts

Year-end charts

Cover versions
In 1989, Japanese singing duo Wink covered the song in the Japanese language with custom lyrics focusing on friendship.

See also
List of number-one R&B singles of 1984 (U.S.)

References

1983 singles
Kool & the Gang songs
1983 songs
Pop ballads
Contemporary R&B ballads
Songs written by James "J.T." Taylor
De-Lite Records singles
Songs written by Claydes Charles Smith
Songs written by Ronald Bell (musician)
Songs written by Robert "Kool" Bell
1980s ballads